Ronnie Joe Jones (born October 17, 1955) is an American football coach. He is the head football coach at Northwestern Oklahoma State University, a position he had held since the 2023 season. Jones has served on coaching staffs at numerous colleges and National Football League (NFL) teams.

A native of Sunray, Texas, Jones graduated from Sunray High School in 1974. He went on to receive a bachelor's degree from Northwestern Oklahoma State University and a master's degree from Northeastern State University. While at Northeastern, he began his coaching career. In 1984, he joined John Cooper's staff at the University of Tulsa as strength and conditioning coach and moved with him to Arizona State University a year later.

In 1987, he joined Buddy Ryan's coaching staff with the Philadelphia Eagles. After two stints with the Los Angeles Rams and Los Angeles Raiders in 1991 and 1992, respectively, Jones rejoined Ryan as linebackers coach for the Houston Oilers in 1993. As Ryan became head coach for the Arizona Cardinals, he selected Jones as his defensive coordinator. In 1995, Arizona ranked last in total defense in the NFL, giving up 26.4 points and 356.5 total yards per game. Ryan and his complete staff were fired subsequently.

Heading back to the collegiate ranks, Jones became defensive coordinator at the University of Texas at El Paso under coach Charlie Bailey. In 2000, Bailey was replaced by Gary Nord, so Jones went on to coach the special teams for the Buffalo Bills. Bills owner Ralph Wilson was unimpressed with Jones's work with the team and demanded Jones's firing after one season; when head coach Wade Phillips refused, Wilson fired them both.

Jones became head coach at Ottawa University, a small NAIA school in Ottawa, Kansas. Jones was the 27th head coach for the Braves and he held that position for the 2001 season.

The Ottawa Braves, coming of a 9–0 season in 2000, finished 6–4 under Jones, who then left for West Texas A&M University.

Despite making the bold statement that West Texas A&M would win an NCAA Division II national football championship under his guidance, Jones amassed only a 5–27 record as Buffaloes head coach.

Head coaching record

References

1955 births
Living people
American strength and conditioning coaches
Arizona Cardinals coaches
Arizona State Sun Devils football coaches
Buffalo Bills coaches
Houston Oilers coaches
Los Angeles Raiders coaches
Los Angeles Rams coaches
National Football League defensive coordinators
Northeastern State RiverHawks football coaches
Northwestern Oklahoma State Rangers football coaches
Ottawa Braves football coaches
Philadelphia Eagles coaches
Tulsa Golden Hurricane football coaches
UTEP Miners football coaches
West Texas A&M Buffaloes football coaches
High school football coaches in Texas
Northeastern State University alumni
Northwestern Oklahoma State University alumni
People from Dumas, Texas
Coaches of American football from Texas